Mark Stephen Allen (born 18 December 1963) is an English former professional footballer who played as a striker.

In 1984, Allen had a spell with second-level side Pallo-Iirot in Finland.

References

1963 births
Living people
Footballers from Newcastle upon Tyne
English footballers
Association football forwards
Burnley F.C. players
Tranmere Rovers F.C. players
Pallo-Iirot players
Runcorn F.C. Halton players
English Football League players
Expatriate footballers in Finland
English expatriate footballers
English expatriate sportspeople in Finland